Class of 1999 is a 1990 American science fiction thriller film directed by Mark L. Lester. It is the director's follow-up to his 1982 film Class of 1984.

Plot

In an alternate 1990s, violence in American high schools had spiraled out of control after a series of mass shootings results in the constitution being abolished and private businesses banned, with areas in most major cities being taken over by youth gangs, resulting in some schools shutting down. Two major gangs vie for control of the former USA.

In 1999, special areas known as "free fire zones" have been established, where police have no jurisdiction, with the CIA being responsible for law enforcement. Seattle's Kennedy High School is in the middle of a free fire zone, thus the Department of Education Defense (D.E.D.), a division of the CIA, has implemented martial law. Working with MegaTech head Dr. Bob Forrest, an experiment begins where three former military robots originally built during the soviet-american war of 1991 have become android educators. Forrest introduces school coach Mr. Bryles, History teacher Mr. Hardin, and Chemistry teacher Ms. Connors to the Board of Education. Impressed with the new teachers, new principal Miles Langford has announced that former delinquents who are imprisoned will be released as part of the new experiment, which would allow new methods of discipline from the new teachers.

One such delinquent is Cody Culp, a member of the Blackhearts gang. Out of prison, Cody has decided to lie low and avoid any gang warfare, especially with the rivals Razorheads, led by Hector. After a car chase, Cody, his younger adopted brother Sonny and his younger biological brother Angel make it to school. Sonny is taken in by the new school guards after he confronts them as they check the car for weapons or drugs. Blackheart member Curt, who thanks to Angel learns Cody no longer wants to be in a gang, informs Cody that if he is not with them, then he is against them. Still, Cody sticks to laying low and attends class. In chemistry class, Ms. Connors attempts calmly talk down Hector and another Razorhead. When the two Razorheads attempt to confront Ms. Connors, she uses fighting skills to take them down and make them sit in their seats. This pleases Forrest and MegaTech, who are in the basement, disguised as a DED control center. When Mr. Hardin's history class is interrupted by a fight between Curt and Razorhead member Flavio, Hardin resorts to using corporal punishment and puts the class in line, saving the students lives. Returning home, Cody is shocked to find his brothers and his mother are addicted to the drug known as "edge". Upset and angry, he leaves and goes on his motorcycle, returning home later that night.

The next day, Flavio attempts to woo Christie, Mr. Langford's daughter, but when she resists his advances, he attempts to rape her. Cody, witnessing what is happening, fights off Flavio as well as Hector. Mr. Bryles, who sees the incident, puts Cody in a full nelson hold and takes him to the principal's office. While Langford informs Cody that he technically violated his parole with the fight, he lets him off due to the fact that he did save Christie from being raped, but has him placed under surveillence. Cody and Bryles head to physical education class, where Bryles, who is the coach, humiliates Blackheart member Mohawk while doing push-ups. When class is over, Bryles tells Cody to stay behind and begins to viciously beat him. Mohawk goes to his locker and takes some "edge" and grabs a gun. Cody, still being beaten, is seriously hurt when Bryles sees Mohawk with the gun. Bryles grabs the gun and breaks Mohawk's neck, killing him instantly. MegaTech technicians Marv and Spence are in total shock when Forrest informs them that it was self-defense with a gun.

When Sonny shows up late to Mr. Hardin's class totally high on "edge", Hardin takes him to his locker. Hardin grabs the locker door and pulls it out to find vials of "edge" in the locker. He proceeds to take the vials and force them into Sonny's mouth while pummeling his head on the lockers. Hardin kills Sonny and upon his return to class, takes Sonny's now bloodied cross and puts it in his pocket. Cody sees the cross as Hardin gives his lecture. When Langford confronts the three teachers about the death of Sonny, it soon becomes a cover-up to say Sonny died of a drug overdose. When Christie tries to convince Cody based on her father's word about Sonny, Cody is angry and is convinced Hardin killed Sonny. Apologizing to Christie the next day, he tries to convince her that Hardin had something to do with Sonny's death and the duo skip school for evidence. Christie and Cody have the teacher directory and learn that Hardin, Bryles, and Connors live in the same apartment. They break in and Cody finds the bloody cross. However, the trio of teachers arrive and catch the duo escaping. A chase ensues and ends up with the trio in the water. Having survived the car crash in the water, the trio decide to start a war between the Razorheads and the Blackhearts.

That evening, Cody and Angel once again bond over a game of basketball. When Angel, who has become a Blackheart, decides to stay behind, he is met by Bryles, Hardin, and Connors on his way home later that night. The trio chase down Angel. Bryles lifts up Angel and throws him against a wall and the trio ultimately kill him. Shortly after, Razorhead Noser is coming out of a local pizza place when he sees Connors. She kidnaps him and when the Razorheads are waiting for Noser, Noser is sent through the window of their hangout while on fire. Hector is convinced the Blackhearts did it and decide to start a war. The next morning, Cody goes to the Blackheart hangout, where he finds a dead Angel surrounded by the likes of Curt, Reedy, and Dawn. Dawn finds Angel's basketball with a message written in blood. Cody, seething with revenge, decides he wants back in the gang.

That afternoon, a war ensues between the Razorheads and Blackhearts. However, Bryles, Hardin, and Connors intercept at various times, killing members from both gangs. When Cody and Reedy go inside an abandoned building to trap Hector, Hardin grabs Reedy through a wall and splits him in half with his bare hands. When Cody shoots at Hardin, he discovers he is not human. That night, Cody tries to tell the Blackhearts that Hardin was there and that he killed Reedy. Meanwhile, Langford has gotten wind of the situation and decides to have the program terminated. However, Dr. Forrest not only decides not to terminate the program, but tells Langford that the teachers must "kill the enemy". Bryles grabs Langford by the throat and with brute force, sticks his poison-tipped fingers in Langford's throat, killing him.

Hector receives a call apparently from Cody saying he wants him one-on-one at the school entrance. Connors, kidnapping Christie, pretends to be Hector and calls Cody with the same proposition. When Dawn wonders why Hector would meet him at the school, the Blackhearts are finally convinced that the teachers are responsible. When Hector and Cody show up with both gangs, Cody attempts to tell Hector that it is not him he wants to kill. He tells Hector of the war the teachers have started. To prove he is right, Cody shows Hector Sonny's bloody cross. The Razorheads and the Blackhearts decide to team up and take on the teachers, who are waiting in the school. While they look for Christie and the teachers, they soon learn of the real situation with the teachers. Ms. Connors' arm becomes a flame thrower. Bryles' arm becomes a missile launcher. While many Razorheads and Blackhearts fall victim to the teachers including Flavio and Dawn, Curt and Cody find Christie. There, they find Hardin. They attempt to shoot down Hardin, but he is too powerful as he grabs Cody with one hand and grabs Curt with his other hand, which has become a grip with a drill attached. Curt is killed by the drill. Hardin attempts to do the same to Cody when Cody reaches for a machine gun and shoots Hardin through the mouth numerous times, destroying him instantly.

Cody and Christie see Ms. Connors and are chased to the chemistry lab. Cody, noticing that Connors has an exposed area of flammable gas, distracts her in time to grab an axe after he instructs Christie to turn on all of the gas in the room. When he throws the axe at the exposed area, he and Christie run out of the lab. Connors, unleashing the flame thrower, fatally explodes due to the flame hitting the gas. Hector, the only other survivor alongside Cody and Christie, meet up with the duo and are seen by Bryles. Hector provides a distraction while Cody and Christie head for a bus, which Cody hotwires, drives fast, and is able to run down Bryles at the school entrance just as Cody and Christie leap out of the bus. The bus explodes but all three are safe. When they hear a noise in the school, they go check it out. However, a now half-human, half-robot Bryles escapes from under the bus.

Hector, Cody, and Christie find Dr. Forrest who takes Christie hostage. When Cody tells Forrest it is too late, Forrest is convinced that he can somehow continue the project. When Hector attempts to shoot Forrest, he is shot and killed. Forrest then attempts to kill Cody, but Bryles comes up from behind him and rips his heart out, killing him instantly. Cody and Christie are at first overpowered by Bryles until Cody finds a forklift and impales Bryles. Christie grabs the nearest chain and puts it around Bryles' neck with Cody using the forklift to lift the chain, cutting the robotic Bryles's head. Cody and Christie, the only survivors, walk out of the badly damaged school in safety as the CIA arrive to contain and destroy any surviving robots.

Cast

 Bradley Gregg as Cody Culp
 Traci Lind as Christie Langford
 John P. Ryan as Mr. Hardin
 Pam Grier as Miss Connors
 Patrick Kilpatrick as Mr. Bryles
 Stacy Keach as Dr. Robert "Bob" Forrest
 Malcolm McDowell as Dr. Miles Langford
 Joshua John Miller as Angel Culp
 Darren E. Burrows as Sonny Culp
 Sharon Wyatt as Janice Culp
 James Medina as Hector
 Jason Oliver as Curt
 Brent David Fraser as Flavio
 Jill Gatsby as Dawn
 Sean Hagerty as Reedy
 Sean Gregory Sullivan as Mohawk
 David Wasman as Guard
 Landon Wine as Noser
 Barbara Coffin as Matron
 Linda Burden-Williams as Secretary 
 Lanny Rees as Desk Sergeant 
 Barry M. Press as Gould
 James McIntire as Technician 1
 Lee Arenberg as Technician 2
 Rose McGowan as Girl Outside Langford's Office (uncredited)

Filming locations
The film was shot in 1988, at Lincoln High School in Seattle's Wallingford neighborhood. In the introduction of the film, the exterior of the school is clearly visible as a heavily secured area with two guard towers on top of the stairs leading to the entrance.

Release

Theatrical
The film was originally scheduled to be released by Vestron Pictures through their subsidiary Lightning Pictures on October 6, 1989, but Vestron's financial turmoil resulted in the film being sold to Taurus Entertainment Group in March 1990. Taurus eventually released the film theatrically on May 11, 1990.

Home media
Class of 1999 was initially released on VHS via Vestron Video in 1991, and was later withdrawn. It was released on DVD in other countries such as South Korea and Australia. In 2001, a widescreen DVD edition of the movie was released through Columbia Tristar Home Entertainment in the U.K. The film's first American DVD release was by Lionsgate, on September 16, 2008. In 2012, Lionsgate included Class of 1999 in a DVD box set with seven other horror movies. The magazine Fangoria released the film under their banner on Hulu in March 2015. Lionsgate released the movie on Blu-ray in January 2018, as part of its new Vestron Video Collector's Series.

Soundtrack
Midge Ure's "Come The Day" is used under the closing credits of the film. Ure recorded the track while on tour in the United States in 1989. He would later say that he disliked the song, as well as the film.

Class of '99
When the musicians Layne Staley and Tom Morello decided to join efforts to record a song for the soundtrack of the movie The Faculty (released December 25, 1998 in Northern America and 1999 in the rest of the world) they named this supergroup Class of '99.

Reception
The film received a score of 63% based on 8 reviews on Rotten Tomatoes. Metacritic gave the film a score of 33 based on 9 reviews, indicating "generally unfavorable reviews".

Awards
Joshua John Miller was nominated for a Young Artist Award for his performance in the film.

Sequel
A sequel, titled Class of 1999 II: The Substitute, was released direct-to-video in 1994. The plots of the three films in the series (the first being Class of 1984) are only loosely related to each other.

References

External links
 
 
 

1990 films
1990 action thriller films
1990 crime thriller films
1990s high school films
1990s science fiction horror films
1990s science fiction action films
Android (robot) films
American high school films
Films about educators
Films about school violence
Films set in 1999
Films set in the future
American dystopian films
American action thriller films
American science fiction horror films
American science fiction action films
American crime thriller films
American independent films
Cyberpunk films
Vestron Pictures films
Films set in Seattle
Films directed by Mark L. Lester
Films scored by Michael Hoenig
1990s English-language films
1990s American films